Bajos de Güera is a corregimiento in Macaracas District, Los Santos Province, Panama with a population of 619 as of 2010. Its population as of 1990 was 897; its population as of 2000 was 738.

References

Corregimientos of Los Santos Province